The Greatest Show on Earth is an American drama series starring Jack Palance about the American circus, which aired on ABC from September 17, 1963, to April 28, 1964. It was produced by Desilu, the production company founded by Lucille Ball and Desi Arnaz, Sr.

Plot

Guest stars

 Don Ameche
 John Astin
 Lucille Ball 
 Edgar Bergen
 Joan Blondell
 Patricia Breslin
 Geraldine Brooks
 Joe E. Brown
 Ellen Burstyn
 Red Buttons
 Spring Byington 
 Rory Calhoun
 James Coburn
 Yvonne De Carlo
 William Demarest
 Bruce Dern
 Brandon deWilde
 Tony Dow
 Bill Erwin
 Stuart Erwin 
 Fabian
 Nina Foch
 Anthony Franciosa
 Annette Funicello 
 Billy Gray
 Dabbs Greer
 Dwayne Hickman 
 Dennis Hopper
 Betty Hutton
 Buster Keaton
 Ruby Keeler
 Russell Johnson
 Jack Lord 
 Dorothy Malone
 Ricardo Montalbán
 Joanna Moore
 Agnes Moorehead
 Bill Mumy
 Barry Nelson
 Julie Newmar
 Sheree North
 Edmond O'Brien
 Cliff Robertson
 Ruth Roman
 Dean Stockwell
 Russ Tamblyn
 Russell Thorson
 Brenda Vaccaro
 Deborah Walley
 Tuesday Weld 
 James Whitmore

Episodes

Reception
The Greatest Show on Earth faced competition from two comedy programs on CBS: Petticoat Junction, Bea Benaderet's burgeoning spin-off of The Beverly Hillbillies (which was in its first year of a successful run), and the long-running The Jack Benny Program. NBC aired The Richard Boone Show at the same 9 p.m. Tuesday slot. The series was canceled after one season.

References

External links
 
 

1963 American television series debuts
1964 American television series endings
1960s American drama television series
American Broadcasting Company original programming
Black-and-white American television shows
Circus television shows
English-language television shows
Television series by CBS Studios
Television series by Desilu Productions